"As We Enter" is the first single from Nas and Damian Marley's collaboration album, Distant Relatives. The track is produced by Damian Marley. There are no full verses in the song, but rather Nas and Damian Marley rap in call-and-response fashion. The track contains samples of Mulatu Astatke's song "Yegelle Tezeta".

Charts

Remixes
A video was released by Kya Bamba on YouTube called "We Speak No Jamaicano", a merge of As We Enter and the single "We Speak No Americano" by Yolanda Be Cool.

References

External links
 

Nas songs
Damian Marley songs
2010 songs
2010 singles
Songs written by Nas
Universal Republic Records singles
Songs written by Damian Marley